Leo de Block (14 August 1904 – 4 January 1988) was a Dutch politician of the defunct Catholic People's Party (KVP) now merged into the Christian Democratic Appeal (CDA) party and businessman.

De Block attended the Ignatius Gymnasium in Amsterdam from April 1917 until May 1923 and applied at the Leiden University in June 1923 majoring in Law and obtaining a Bachelor of Laws degree in June 1925 before graduating with a Master of Laws degree in July 1929. De Block worked as Chief executive officer (CEO) of the Incasso Bank from July 1946 until February 1947. De Block worked as a civil servant for the Ministry of Finance from February 1947 until May 1959 as Director-General of the department of Budgetary Affairs from February 1947 until March 1953 and as Deputy Secretary-General of the Ministry of Finance from March 1953 until April 1959 and for the Ministry of Economic Affairs as Director-General of the department for General Economic Policy from April 1959 until May 1960. In May 1960 he was nominated as Chief financial officer (CFO) of KLM.

After the election of 1963 De Block was appointed as State Secretary for Foreign Affairs in the Cabinet Marijnen, taking office on 3 September 1963. The Cabinet Marijnen fell on 27 February 1965 after a disagreement in the coalition about reforms to the public broadcasting system and continued to serve in a demissionary capacity until the cabinet formation of 1965 when it was replaced by the Cabinet Cals with De Block continuing as State Secretary for Foreign Affairs, taking office on 4 May 1965. The Cabinet Cals fell on 14 October 1966 after the Leader of the Catholic People's Party Norbert Schmelzer had proposed a motion that called for a stronger austerity policy to further reduce the deficit was seen an indirect motion of no confidence and continued to serve in a demissionary capacity until the cabinet formation of 1966 when it was replaced by the caretaker Cabinet Zijlstra with De Block remaining State Secretary for Foreign Affairs and also appointed as State Secretary for Transport and Water Management and dual served in those positions, taking office on 22 November 1966. In December De Block announced that he wouldn't stand for the election of 1967. Following the cabinet formation of 1967 De Block was appointed as Minister of Economic Affairs in the Cabinet De Jong, taking office on 5 April 1967. On 7 January 1970 De Block resigned after he disagreed with the cabinets decision to increase the wages in the metal industry but another reason was criticism on his leadership in the handling of the rising inflation after the introduction of the Value-added tax (BTW).

De Block semi-retired from in national politics and became active in the private sector and public sector and occupied numerous seats as a corporate director and nonprofit director on several boards of directors and supervisory boards (DSM Company, ING Group, Robeco and Van Lanschot) and served on several state commissions and councils on behalf of the government (Cadastre Agency, Dutch Transport Safety Board and the Advisory Council for Foreign Affairs).

Decorations

References

External links

Official
  Mr. L. (Leo) de Block Parlement & Politiek

 

 

1904 births
1988 deaths
Businesspeople from Amsterdam
Van Lanschot Kempen people
Catholic People's Party politicians
Commanders of the Order of the Netherlands Lion
Commanders of the Order of Orange-Nassau
Dutch bankers
Dutch chief executives in the airline industry
Dutch chief executives in the finance industry
Dutch corporate directors
Dutch financial analysts
Dutch nonprofit directors
Dutch Roman Catholics
Leiden University alumni
Ministers of Economic Affairs of the Netherlands
Politicians from The Hague
State Secretaries for Foreign Affairs of the Netherlands
State Secretaries for Transport of the Netherlands
20th-century Dutch businesspeople
20th-century Dutch civil servants
20th-century Dutch economists
20th-century Dutch jurists
20th-century Dutch politicians